The Roman Catholic Diocese of Jining is a diocese located in Jining (Ulanqab) in the Ecclesiastical province of Suiyuan in China.

History
 February 8, 1929: Established as Apostolic Vicariate of Jining 集寧 from the Apostolic Vicariate of Xiwanzi 西彎子
 April 1, 1946: Promoted as Diocese of Jining 集寧

Special churches
Formal Cathedral:
玫瑰營天主堂

Leadership
 Bishops of Jining 集寧 (Roman rite)
 Bishop Antonio Yao Shun (2019–)
 Bishop John Liu Shi-gong (1995–2017)
 Bishop Joseph Fan Heng'an (Fan Heng'an) (樊恆安) (April 11, 1946–1975)
 Vicars Apostolic of Jining 集寧 (Roman Rite)
 Bishop Joseph Fan Heng'an (Fan Heng'an) (樊恆安) (January 10, 1933–April 11, 1946)
 Bishop Evaristo Zhang Zhiliang (張智良) (February 10, 1929–May 26, 1932)

References

 GCatholic.org
 Catholic Hierarchy

Roman Catholic dioceses in China
Christian organizations established in 1929
Roman Catholic dioceses and prelatures established in the 20th century
Religion in Inner Mongolia
Ulanqab